Today I Was With Frieda (German: Heut' war ich bei der Frieda) is a 1928 German silent film directed by Siegfried Philippi and starring Hans Albers, Mary Parker and Evi Eva.

The film's sets were designed by the art director Robert A. Dietrich.

Cast
 Hans Albers as Eric Hahn 
 Mary Parker as Frieda Engel 
 Evi Eva as Leonie Heuser 
 Hans Brausewetter
 Henry Bender as Otto Grimmelsbach 
 Robert Garrison as M. Heuser 
 Margarete Kupfer as Mme. Heuser 
 Otto Reinwald

References

Bibliography
 Bock, Hans-Michael & Bergfelder, Tim. The Concise CineGraph. Encyclopedia of German Cinema. Berghahn Books, 2009.

External links

1928 films
Films of the Weimar Republic
German silent feature films
German black-and-white films
Films directed by Siegfried Philippi